Denis Wilson (born 30 April 1936) is an English former footballer who played in the Football League for Stoke City.

Career
Wilson started his football career at Welsh side Wrexham's youth team; whilst he was a regular for their Reserve side, he never was able to break into the first team and left in 1955 to join Welsh league side Rhyl. He spent three years at Rhyl and was a stand out performer in the league which attracted the attention of a number of Football League sides. He joined Stoke City in 1958 with Frank Taylor acquiring the full backs signature. He made his debut for the "Potters" in a 6–1 win against Lincoln City in September 1959. Wilson went on to make 13 more appearances for City before new manager Tony Waddington deemed him surplus to requirements and was released in 1961. He re-entered the Welsh league with Bangor City.

Career statistics

References

External links
 

English footballers
Stoke City F.C. players
Wrexham A.F.C. players
English Football League players
1936 births
Living people
Rhyl F.C. players
Bangor City F.C. players
Association football defenders